Elena Bovina and Daniela Hantuchová were the defending champions, but none competed this year. Bovina decided to focus on the singles tournament, while Hantuchová competed in Linz at the same week.

Kim Clijsters and Janette Husárová won the title by defeating Květa Hrdličková and Barbara Rittner 4–6, 6–3, 7–5 in the final.

Seeds

Draw

Draw

References

External links
 Official results archive (ITF)
 Official results archive (WTA)

2002 Doubles
SEAT Open - Doubles
2002 in Luxembourgian tennis